Pablo Cuevas was the last edition champion, but he chose to defend another of his previous title in Båstad which was held simultaneously with the Croatia Open Umag this year.

Dominic Thiem won the title, defeating João Sousa in the final, 6–4, 6–1.

Seeds
The top four seeds receive a bye into the second round.

Draw

Finals

Top half

Bottom half

Qualifying

Seeds

Qualifiers

Qualifying draw

First qualifier

Second qualifier

Third qualifier

Fourth qualifier

References
 Main Draw
 Qualifying Draw

2015 ATP World Tour
2015 Singles
2015 in Croatian tennis